The 2018 Wisconsin gubernatorial election took place on November 6, 2018.  It occurred concurrently with a Senate election in the state, elections to the state's U.S. House seats, and various other elections. Incumbent Republican Governor Scott Walker sought re-election to a third term, and was challenged by Democratic candidate and then-Superintendent of Public Instruction Tony Evers, as well as Libertarian Phil Anderson and independent Maggie Turnbull. Evers, along with his running mate Mandela Barnes, managed to defeat Walker and Lieutenant Governor Rebecca Kleefisch in a closely fought and widely watched race, ending unified Republican control of the state.

The result was considered "too close to call" on election night, with Walker and Evers being separated by a mere few hundred votes for much of the night as counties reported their results. Shortly after midnight on November 7, Milwaukee County reported around 46,000 late absentee ballots. From those late ballots, Evers received 38,674 votes, or 84% of the total, and Walker 7,181, giving Evers a narrow lead. The race was called for him shortly after.

Wisconsin was the only state in the 2018 gubernatorial election cycle to elect a Democratic governor while voting more Republican than the national average. With a margin of 1.1%, this election was also the second-closest race of the 2018 gubernatorial election cycle, behind only the election in Florida. Walker was one of two Republican incumbent governors to be defeated for re-election in 2018, the other being Bruce Rauner in neighboring Illinois, who had lost decisively to J.B. Pritzker.

Republican primary

Governor

Candidates

Nominated
 Scott Walker, incumbent governor

Eliminated in primary
 Robert Meyer, businessman and candidate for mayor of Sun Prairie in 2007

Endorsements

Results

Lieutenant governor

Candidates

Nominated
 Rebecca Kleefisch, incumbent lieutenant governor

Results

Democratic primary

Governor
The primary election for the Democratic nomination featured a crowded field of candidates. The race was ultimately won by Tony Evers with around 40% of the vote.

Candidates

Nominated
 Tony Evers, Wisconsin state superintendent of public instruction

Eliminated in primary
 Matt Flynn, former chair of the Democratic Party of Wisconsin, retired partner at Quarles & Brady and candidate for U.S. Senate in 1986
 Mike McCabe, former executive director of Wisconsin Democracy Campaign and candidate for the State Assembly in 1998
 Mahlon Mitchell, president of the Professional Fire Fighters of Wisconsin and nominee for lieutenant governor in 2012
 Josh Pade, lawyer
 Kelda Roys, former state representative and candidate for WI-02 in 2012
 Paul Soglin, Mayor of Madison and nominee for WI-02 in 1996
 Kathleen Vinehout, state senator and candidate for governor in 2012

Withdrew
 Mike Crute, liberal talk radio broadcaster (endorsed Mike McCabe)
 Michele Doolan, businesswoman (endorsed Matt Flynn)
 Andy Gronik, businessman (still on ballot; endorsed Kelda Roys)
 Bob Harlow, candidate for CA-18 in 2016 (endorsed Matt Flynn)
 Kurt Kober, businessman (running for lieutenant governor)
 Jeff Rumbaugh, disability rights activist. (endorsed Mike McCabe)
 Dana Wachs, state representative (still on ballot; endorsed Tony Evers)

Declined
 Chris Abele, Milwaukee County Executive
 Mark Bakken, businessman
 Peter Barca, state representative and former U.S. Representative
 Tom Barrett, Mayor of Milwaukee, former U.S. Representative and nominee for governor in 2010 and 2012.
 John T. Chisholm, Milwaukee County District Attorney (endorsed Matt Flynn)
 Kevin Conroy, president and CEO of Exact Sciences
 Timothy Cullen, former state senator
 Katherine Gehl, former president and CEO of Gehl Foods
 Gordon Hintz, minority leader of the State Assembly
 Brett Hulsey, former state representative and candidate for governor in 2014
 Ron Kind, U.S. Representative
 James Kreuser, Kenosha County executive
 Joe Parisi, Dane County executive
 Mark Pocan, U.S. representative
 Jennifer Shilling, Democratic leader of the State Senate

Endorsements

Polling

An asterisk (*) denotes that a candidate withdrew before the primary but remains on the ballot.

Results

Lieutenant governor
Mandela Barnes, a former state representative from Milwaukee, defeated opponent Kurt Kober by a 2 to 1 margin for the nomination, becoming the first African American to be nominated by a major party for a Wisconsin gubernatorial ticket.

Candidates

Nominated
 Mandela Barnes, former state representative, and candidate for state senate in 2016

Eliminated in primary
 Kurt Kober, businessman

Results

Libertarian convention

Governor

Nominee
 Phil Anderson, chairman of the Wisconsin Libertarian Party and Libertarian nominee for the U.S. Senate in 2016

Endorsements

Lieutenant Governor

Nominee
 Patrick Baird, U.S. Navy veteran

Green Party primary

Governor

Candidates

Nominated
 Michael White

Withdrew
 Nick De Leon, pastor (endorsed Matt Flynn)

Results

Lieutenant Governor

Candidates

Nominated
 Tiffany Anderson

Results

Independent candidates

Governor
 Maggie Turnbull, astrobiologist

Lieutenant governor
 Wil Losch, Turnbull's running mate

General election
Despite the fact that Scott Walker had won three prior races for Governor in 2010, 2012, and 2014 by fairly comfortable margins, his bid for a third term was complicated by rising unpopularity due to his policies concerning public education and infrastructure. Walker also faced backlash for a deal his administration made with Taiwanese company Foxconn in 2017 to create jobs in the state in exchange for around $4.5 billion in taxpayer subsidies. In 2018, the deal resulted in around $90 million of funding for roads being diverted to a stretch of I-94 that was set to be near a future Foxconn plant from the rest of state. The poor condition of many roads around the state as well as the lack of work being done to redo them prompted a campaign where potholes were being labeled as “Scott”-holes.

Walker's approval ratings were hobbled further by the unpopularity of Republican U.S. President Donald Trump in Wisconsin. Walker himself sounded the alarm on this several times in early 2018 after Democrats won two special elections to the Wisconsin State Senate in typically Republican districts and an election to the Wisconsin Supreme Court. In April 2018, Walker warned that Wisconsin was “at risk of a blue wave“ in November. The Walker campaign generally focused on promoting the popular parts of his record, such as a freeze on tuition at public universities and record low unemployment.

The result was expected to be close, with a record $93 million spent on the race by the two major campaigns and special interest groups from in and out of the state. In the end, Walker was ultimately defeated by Democrat Tony Evers, who garnered a slightly more than 1% margin of victory, as Democrats swept every statewide race up for election.

Predictions

Polling

with Kelda Roys

with Matt Flynn

with Mike McCabe

with Mahlon Mitchell

with Josh Pade

with Paul Soglin

with Kathleen Vinehout

with Andy Gronik

with Dana Wachs

Results 

Evers won the election by a 1.09% margin.

Results by county

Aftermath 
Despite the close result, Scott Walker was unable to request a recount due to a law he had signed himself two years prior, which requires the margin of difference to be within 1%.

Lame duck legislative session
Early in December 2018, a special legislative session was called by Walker to pass a series of bills to limit the powers of Governor-elect Evers, as well as incoming Democratic State attorney general Josh Kaul who had defeated incumbent Brad Schimel.

Other bills being considered included restrictions on early voting and the passage of Medicaid work requirements, which Walker had previously held off on due to the election. A similar law restricting early voting that was passed several years prior had been ruled as unconstitutional.

The bills were widely denounced by Democrats and others as a “power grab.” Congresswoman Gwen Moore described the move as a “coup” that “hijacked the voters’ will.”  Walker and other Republicans meanwhile argued that the bills were necessary ”checks on power” and that they did not actually strip any real powers from the executive. Lawsuits were filed by Evers and various labor unions almost immediately after Walker signed the bills into law.

See also 
2018 Wisconsin elections
2018 United States gubernatorial elections
2018 United States elections

Notes

References

External links
Candidates at Vote Smart
Candidates at Ballotpedia

Official campaign websites
Phil Anderson (L) for Governor
Arnie Enz (WI Party) for Governor
Tony Evers (D) for Governor
Robbie Hoffman (I) for Governor
Maggie Turnbull (I) for Governor
Scott Walker (R) for Governor
Michael White (G) for Governor

2018 Wisconsin elections
2018
Wisconsin